HK Zemgale/LLU are a Latvian ice hockey team that plays in the Mestis, the second tier of ice hockey in Finland and also Latvian Hockey Higher League. The team is based in Jelgava and play their home games at the Jelgava Ice hall.

History
The team was founded in 2002, shortly after the opening of the Jelgava Ice hall, in cooperation with the Ministry of Defence. The team was initially called ASK/Zemgale, and joined the Latvian Hockey Higher League, in addition the team also participated in Division 2 of the Eastern European Hockey League during the 2002–03 season. At the culmination of the season, financial issues meant that the team split in two, with the ASK franchise relocating to Ogre, creating ASK/Ogre, whilst the Zemgale side of the partnership remained in the town, operating under the name HK Zemgale. The team remained in the Latvian first tier for two further seasons before disbanding following the culmination of the 2004–05 season.

Zemgale remained inactive until the 2010–11 season, when they reformed and returned to the Latvian top tier, where they have played since. Usually a mid-table team, HK Zemgale's most successful season came in the 2017-18 season where they made it to the play-off final, ultimately losing to HK Kurbads, under Head Coach Haralds Vasiljevs.

In 2013, the team established a partnership with the Latvia University of Life Sciences and Technologies ( (LLU)). In addition, Zemgale also serve as the farm team to the KHL's Dinamo Riga. During the 2020/21 season, David Levin played a handful of games for the team whilst under contract with Dinamo.

Roster 
Updated February 11, 2021.

Season-by-season record
Note: GP = Games played, W = Wins, L = Losses, T = Ties, OTL = Overtime losses, Pts = Points, GF = Goals for, GA = Goals against, PIM = Penalties in minutes

Team records

Career
These are the top five scorers in HK Zemgale/LLU history.

''Note: Pos = Position; GP = Games played; G = Goals; A = Assists; Pts = Points

Penalty minutes: Krišs Kupčus, 211

Season

Regular season 
 Most goals in a season: Guntis Pujāts, 31 (2011–12)
 Most assists in a season: Guntis Pujāts, 38 (2011–12)
 Most points in a season: Guntis Pujāts, 69 (2011–12)
 Most penalty minutes in a season: Gatis Gajevskis, 135 (2004–05)

Playoffs 
 Most goals in a playoff season: Ivan Rybchik, 9 (2017–18)
 Most assists in a playoff season: Artūrs Āboliņš, 7 (2014–15)
 Most points in a playoff season: Māris Miezis, 11 (2014–15)
 Most penalty minutes in a playoff season: Olafs Aploks, 41 (2017–18)

Notable players
 David Levin

Notable coaches
 Haralds Vasiljevs

References

External links
 HK Zemgale/LLU
 

Ice hockey clubs established in 2002
Latvian Hockey League teams
2002 establishments in Latvia
Jelgava
Ice hockey teams in Latvia